The Slips are a UK electronic music duo, composed of David Treahearn and Rob Haggett. James Cooper is the duo's live drummer and regularly DJs in The Slips' Australasian club sets. The duo formed the band in Kentish Town in London, mid-2007 after they met while working together as studio engineers at Olympic Studios in London with artists including Madonna, Björk, The Black Eyed Peas, Gwen Stefani, New Order, Oasis and Massive Attack.

Along with producing original electronic dance music and mixtapes, The Slips are also DJs and remixers  having remixed international artists such as Björk The Crystal Fighters, CSS, LCD Soundsystem The XX, I Blame Coco, Phoenix, Kylie Minogue and Ellie Goulding as featured in NME Magazine. They have also remixed artists Gotye, Bertie BlackmanYuksek  and Zowie. Their remixes and live performances have seen them featured in UK press including AXM Magazine, The Gay Times, US digital music blog aggregator Hype Machine and Music Week.

As well as regular London live performances, the band performed at Glastonbury Festival in 2009 as part of Q magazine's 'Emerging Talent' program on the Queen's Head stage. In 2010 the UK Music Industry publication The Unsigned Guide wrote the feature article "The Rise Of The Slips: A Roadmap To Learn From"

UK & European live festival performances include the O2 Wireless festival in London's Hyde Park, The Great Escape Festival supporting Alex Metric, Pnau and Adam Freeland the Amsterdam dance event Music Industry conference, the Remix Bubble at Secret Garden Party and in 2011 at The O2 Arena with Kasabian and Bombay Bicycle Club.

The Slips original track "4 Elements to Make Good Music" was the official backing track for the Labrokes Euro 2012 advertising campaign. Ministry Of Sound featured The Slips on the Australian Ministry Of Sound 2012 Annual Compilation for their remix of the Flight Facilities track 'Foreign Language'. In late November 2012, The Slips remix of Björk's track Moon from her album Biophilia was chosen as an official remix for her third remix album Bastards. In 2012, The Slips signed to EMI Records, later releasing the track "Make It Out Alright" featuring Bossy Love with a music video filmed in New York City.

References

External links
 The Slips website
 The Slips mixtapes and remixes on SoundCloud
 The Slips on Facebook
 The Slips on Twitter
 The Slips music videos by Dan Shipton, '4 Elements' & '3.0.3', 2009/2010
 The Slips on Manaloge, 2009
 Elbo.ws: Top 10 Tracks of 2008: The Slips, 'Girls at the Back Up'
 I Am Sound Records, USA release: The Slips, 'Girls at the Back Up', 2008
 John Lee Bird 2008 Before Encore 3 featuring portraits of David Treahearn and Rob Haggett of The Slips

English electronic music duos
Musical groups from the London Borough of Camden
People from Kentish Town
Musical groups established in 2007